Hoseyn Kuh (also Romanized as Ḩoseyn Kūh) is a village in Gasht Rural District, in the Central District of Fuman County, Gilan Province, Iran. At the 2006 census, its population was 631, in 158 families.

References 

Populated places in Fuman County